Shèng Mào (Sheng Mao, traditional: 盛懋, simplified: 盛懋); was a Chinese landscape painter during the Yuan Dynasty (1271–1368). His specific dates of birth and death are not known.

Sheng was born in Jiaxing the Zhejiang province. He was taught by Chen Lin, and later by Zhao Mengfu. Sheng's paintings of landscape and human figures utilized a delicate style with beautiful colors.

References

External links
Sung and Yuan paintings, an exhibition catalog from The Metropolitan Museum of Art Libraries (fully available online as PDF), which contains material on Sheng Mao (see list of paintings)

Painters from Zhejiang
Yuan dynasty landscape painters
Year of death unknown
Artists from Jiaxing
Year of birth unknown